Queen Māyā of Shakya' was the birth mother of Gautama Buddha, the sage on whose teachings Buddhism was founded. She was sister of Mahāpajāpatī Gotamī, the first Buddhist nun ordained by the Buddha.<ref name=Shaw45> Buddhist Goddesses of India by Miranda Shaw (Oct 16, 2006)  pages 45-46</ref>

In Buddhist tradition, Maya died soon after the birth of Buddha, generally said to be seven days afterwards, and came to life again in a Hindu-Buddhist heaven, a pattern that is said to be followed in the births of all Buddhas. Thus Maya did not raise her son who was instead raised by his maternal aunt Mahapajapati Gotami. Maya would, however, on occasion descend from Heaven to give advice to her son.

Māyā (माया) means "illusion" in Sanskrit. Māyā is also called Mahāmāyā (महामाया, "Great Māyā") and Māyādevī (मायादेवी, "Queen Māyā"). In Chinese, she is known as Móyé-fūrén (摩耶夫人, "Lady Māyā"), in Tibetan she is known as Gyutrulma and in Japanese she is known as Maya-bunin (摩耶夫人). Also, in Sinhalese she is known as මහාමායා දේවී (Mahāmāyā Dēvi).

Iconography

In Buddhist literature and art Queen Maya is portrayed as a beautiful fecund woman in the prime of life.

Her beauty sparkles like a nugget of pure gold. 
She has perfumed curls like the large black bee.
Eyes like lotus petals, teeth like stars in the heavens.
— From the Lalitavistara Sūtra

Although sometimes shown in other scenes from her life, such as having a dream foretelling her pregnancy with Gautama Buddha or with her husband King Śuddhodana seeking prophecies about their son's life, shortly after his birth, she is most often depicted whilst giving birth to Gautama, an event that is generally accepted to have taken place in Lumbini in modern-day Terai. Maya is usually shown giving birth standing under a tree and reaching overhead to hold on to a branch for support. Buddhist scholar Miranda Shaw, states that Queen Maya's depiction in the nativity scene follows a pattern established in earlier Buddhist depictions of the tree spirits known as yaksini.

Life of Maya

Māyā married King Śuddhodana (Pāli: Suddhodana), the ruler of the Śākya clan of Kapilvastu. She was the daughter of King Śuddhodhana's uncle and therefore his cousin; her father was king of Devadaha.

Māyā and King Suddhodhana did not have children for twenty years into their marriage. According to legend, one full moon night, sleeping in the palace, the queen had a vivid dream. She felt herself being carried away by four devas (spirits) to Lake Anotatta in the Himalayas. After bathing her in the lake, the devas clothed her in heavenly cloths, anointed her with perfumes, and bedecked her with divine flowers. Soon after a white elephant, holding a white lotus flower in its trunk, appeared and went round her three times, entering her womb through her right side. Finally the elephant disappeared and the queen awoke, knowing she had been delivered an important message, as the elephant is a symbol of greatness.

According to Buddhist tradition, the Buddha-to-be was residing as a bodhisattva in the  heaven, and decided to take the shape of a white elephant to be reborn on Earth for the last time. Māyā gave birth to Siddharta c. 563 BCE. The pregnancy lasted ten lunar months. Following custom, the Queen returned to her own home for the birth. On the way, she stepped down from her palanquin to have a walk under the Sal tree (Shorea robusta), often confused with the Ashoka tree (Saraca asoca), in the beautiful flower garden of Lumbini Park, Lumbini Zone, Nepal. Maya Devi was delighted by the park and gave birth standing while holding onto a sal branch. Legend has it that Prince Siddhārtha emerged from her right side. It was the eighth day of April. Some accounts say she gave him his first bath in the Puskarini pond in Lumbini Zone. But legend has it that devas caused it to rain to wash the newborn baby. He was later named Siddhārtha, "He who has accomplished his goals" or "The accomplished goal".

Scholars generally agree that most Buddhist literature holds that Maya died seven days after the birth of Buddha, and was then reborn in the Tusita Heaven. Seven years after the Buddha's enlightenment, she came down to visit Tavatimsa Heaven, where the Buddha later preached the Abhidharma to her. Her sister Prajāpatī (Pāli: Pajāpatī or Mahāpajāpatī Gotamī) became the child's foster mother.

After Siddhartha had attained Enlightenment and become the Buddha, he visited his mother in heaven for three months to pay respects and to teach the Dharma.

Cross-cultural analogies

Some parallels have been drawn with the birth story of the Buddha and Jesus. Z. P. Thundy has surveyed the similarities and differences between the birth stories of Buddha by Maya and Jesus by Mary and notes that while there may have been similarities, there are also differences, e.g. that Mary outlives Jesus after raising him, but Maya dies soon after the birth of Buddha, as all mothers of Buddhas do in the Buddhist tradition. Thundy does not assert that there is any historical evidence that the Christian birth stories of Jesus were derived from the Buddhist traditions, but suggests that "maybe it is time that Christian scholars looked in the Buddhist tradition for the sources of the idea".

Eddy and Gregorio A. Boyd state that there is no evidence of a historical influence by outside sources on the authors of the New Testament, and most scholars agree that any such historical influence on Christianity is entirely implausible given that first century monotheistic Galilean Jews would not have been open to what they would have seen as pagan stories.

See also
 The birth of Buddha (Lalitavistara)
 Family of Gautama Buddha
 History of Buddhism
 Maya Devi Temple, Lumbini

References

External links 
 

6th-century BC women
Family of Gautama Buddha
Ancient queens consort
Year of birth unknown
560s BC deaths
Indian queen consorts
Deaths in childbirth